Ulmus parvifolia 'BSNUPF (selling name ) is a Chinese Elm cultivar that was raised by John Barbour of Athena Trees, Monroe, Georgia.

Description

Pests and diseases
The species and its cultivars are highly resistant, but not immune, to Dutch elm disease, and completely unaffected by the Elm Leaf Beetle Xanthogaleruca luteola. Damage caused by the Japanese Beetle is relatively slight.

Cultivation
 is reputedly fast growing on well-drained soil. The tree has been selected for inclusion in the National Elm Trial coordinated by Colorado State University. The cultivar was introduced to the UK by Golden Hill Plants, Morden, Kent, in 2010, but discontinued owing to poor sales.

Nurseries
Commercial Nursery, Decherd, Tennessee, US.

Accessions
None known.

References

External links
https://web.archive.org/web/20110721154215/http://treehealth.agsci.colostate.edu/research/nationalelmtrial/NET_Cultivars.htm National Elm Trial coordinated by Colorado State University.

Chinese elm cultivar
Ulmus articles missing images
Ulmus